The 2013 New Zealand Music Awards is the 48th holding of the annual ceremony featuring awards for musical recording artists based in or originating from New Zealand. The main awards event will be held on 21 November 2013 at Vector Arena, Auckland and will again be hosted by Shannon Ryan, along with new host Stan Walker. Nominations opened on 27 May 2013 and closed on 8 July 2013. Eligible works were those released between 1 July 2012 and 30 June 2013. The ceremony will be broadcast on television channel Four, as will a red carpet special hosted by Drew Neemia and Sharyn Casey.

The technical award winners, legacy award recipient and the Critics' Choice Prize shortlist were announced on 22 October at the Pullman hotel, Auckland. The Critics' Choice Prize winner was announced at the Critic's Choice Showcase at the King's Arms bar on 6 November.

Early awards 
While most of the awards are presented at the main awards ceremony held in November, four genre awards are presented earlier at ceremonies of their field. The first was awarded in January, with the Tui for Best Folk Album presented at the Auckland Folk Festival in Kumeu to Auckland alt-country group Great North for their album Halves. The Tui for Best Jazz Album was presented in March to Nathan Haines at the National Jazz Festival in Tauranga for his album The Poet's Embrance. The Tui for Best Pacific Music Album was presented to Aaradhna at the Pacific Music Awards in May for her album Treble & Reverb. The Best Country Music Song Tui was presented to Delaney Davidson and Marlon Williams for their album Sad but True – The Secret History of Country Music Songwriting Vol. 1 at the Gold Guitar Awards, also in May.

In addition, the three technical awards are presented at the ceremony on 22 October 2013. Nominees for the technical categories were announced on 10 October.

Nominees and winners
Winners are listed first and highlighted in boldface.
Key
 – Non-technical award
 – Technical award

Presenters and performers

Presenters
Presenters of awards:
Hosts Stan Walker and Shannon Ryan presented the first three awards: Highest Selling Album, Highest Selling Single and Radio Airplay Award.
Comedians Urzila Carlson and Jesse Griffin awarded Best Electronica Album, Best Roots Album and Best Urban/Hip Hop Album.
Māori musician Ria Hall handed out Best Gospel/Christian Album, Best Classical Album and Best Māori Album.
Damian Vaughan, the CEO of Recorded Music NZ, presented the International Achievement Award.
Rugby player Benji Marshall and his wife, television personality Zoe, awarded Best Rock Album and Best Alternative Album.
Lead singer of The Exponents and New Zealand Music Hall of Fame inductee Jordan Luck bestowed the Legacy Award.
Newsreader Samantha Hayes and broadcaster Paul Henry presented the awards for Best Male and Female Solo Artists.
Media personalities Jono Pryor and Ben Boyce awarded Best Music Video.
Teenage online comedian Jamie Curry and Australian pop singer Cody Simpson presented Best Pop Album.
English performer Natalia Kills awarded Best Group and Breakthrough Artist of the Year.
Madeleine Sami and Thomas Sainsbury presented People's Choice Award.
Musician Dave Dobbyn awarded Album and Single of the Year.

Performers
Performers at the ceremony:
Lorde opened the ceremony with "Royals".
Soul vocalist Iva Lamkum sang "Raise Your Glass".
Jamie McDell performed "Angel".
Ruby Frost sang "Soviet Snow/(Glad I'm) Not a Kennedy" in tribute to Shona Laing.
Boyband Titanium sang "Come on Home/Unarmed".
Aaradhna gave her single "Wake Up".
Stan Walker closed the show with "Bulletproof/Take It Easy".

References

External links
Official New Zealand Music Awards website
Photo gallery by The New Zealand Herald

New Zealand Music Awards, 2013
Music Awards, 2013
Aotearoa Music Awards
November 2013 events in New Zealand